Shabbona Lake State Recreation Area is an Illinois state park on  in Shabbona Township, DeKalb County, Illinois, United States. Shabbona Lake is a man-made lake created in 1975 by damming the (Big) Indian Creek, a tributary of the Fox River.  Its name derives from the Potawatomi leader Shabbona.

Seventy miles west of Chicago, off U.S. 30, urban landscape gives way to 1,550 acres of rolling prairie and a 318.8-acre man-made fishing lake. Shabbona Lake State Recreation Area provides a convenient, natural haven from the hustle and bustle of daily life.

Notes

References

Bodies of water of DeKalb County, Illinois
Protected areas established in 1978
Protected areas of DeKalb County, Illinois
Reservoirs in Illinois
State parks of Illinois
1978 establishments in Illinois